Lampona is a genus of South Pacific spiders in the family Lamponidae that was first described by Tamerlan Thorell in 1869. At least two species have a whitish tip to the abdomen and are known as "white-tailed spiders". Both hunt other spiders and have been introduced to New Zealand. The name is derived from the Middle English laumpe, meaning "light" or "fire".

Species
 it contains fifty-seven species native to Australia and New Guinea:
L. airlie Platnick, 2000 – Australia (Queensland)
L. allyn Platnick, 2000 – Australia (New South Wales)
L. ampeinna Platnick, 2000 – Australia (Western Australia, central Australia)
L. barrow Platnick, 2000 – Australia (Western Australia)
L. braemar Platnick, 2000 – Eastern Australia, Tasmania
L. brevipes L. Koch, 1872 – Australia (Western Australia)
L. bunya Platnick, 2000 – Australia (Queensland)
L. carlisle Platnick, 2000 – Australia (Queensland)
L. chalmers Platnick, 2000 – Australia (Queensland)
L. chinghee Platnick, 2000 – Australia (Queensland, New South Wales)
L. cohuna Platnick, 2000 – Australia (South Australia, Victoria)
L. cudgen Platnick, 2000 – Australia (Queensland, New South Wales, Victoria)
L. cumberland Platnick, 2000 – Australia (Victoria)
L. cylindrata (L. Koch, 1866) (type) – Australia, Tasmania, New Zealand
L. danggali Platnick, 2000 – Central, Eastern Australia
L. davies Platnick, 2000 – Australia (Queensland)
L. dwellingup Platnick, 2000 – Australia (Western Australia)
L. eba Platnick, 2000 – Australia (South Australia)
L. ewens Platnick, 2000 – Australia (South Australia, Tasmania)
L. fife Platnick, 2000 – Australia (New South Wales, Victoria)
L. finke Platnick, 2000 – Australia (Northern Territory, South Australia)
L. finnigan Platnick, 2000 – Australia (Queensland)
L. flavipes L. Koch, 1872 – Central, Eastern Australia
L. foliifera Simon, 1908 – Australia (Western Australia, central Australia)
L. garnet Platnick, 2000 – Australia (Queensland)
L. gilles Platnick, 2000 – Australia (South Australia)
L. gosford Platnick, 2000 – Australia (New South Wales, Victoria)
L. hickmani Platnick, 2000 – Australia (Tasmania)
L. hirsti Platnick, 2000 – Australia (South Australia)
L. kapalga Platnick, 2000 – Australia (Northern Territory, Queensland)
L. kirrama Platnick, 2000 – Australia (Queensland)
L. lamington Platnick, 2000 – Australia (Queensland)
L. lomond Platnick, 2000 – Southeastern Australia, Tasmania
L. macilenta L. Koch, 1873 – Southern Australia
L. mildura Platnick, 2000 – Australia (New South Wales, Victoria)
L. molloy Platnick, 2000 – Australia (Queensland)
L. monteithi Platnick, 2000 – Australia (Queensland)
L. moorilyanna Platnick, 2000 – Australia (Queensland, South Australia)
L. murina L. Koch, 1873 – Eastern Australia, New Zealand
L. olga Platnick, 2000 – Australia (Northern Territory)
L. ooldea Platnick, 2000 – Australia (South Australia, Victoria)
L. papua Platnick, 2000 – New Guinea
L. punctigera Simon, 1908 – Southern Australia
L. pusilla L. Koch, 1873 – Eastern Australia
L. quinqueplagiata Simon, 1908 – Australia (Western Australia)
L. ruida L. Koch, 1873 – Eastern Australia, Tasmania
L. russell Platnick, 2000 – Australia (Queensland)
L. spec Platnick, 2000 – Australia (Queensland)
L. superbus Platnick, 2000 – Australia (Queensland)
L. talbingo Platnick, 2000 – Southeastern Australia
L. taroom Platnick, 2000 – Australia (Queensland)
L. terrors Platnick, 2000 – Australia (Queensland)
L. torbay Platnick, 2000 – Australia (Western Australia)
L. tulley Platnick, 2000 – Australia (Queensland)
L. walsh Platnick, 2000 – Australia (Western Australia)
L. whaleback Platnick, 2000 – Australia (Western Australia)
L. yanchep Platnick, 2000 – Australia (Western Australia)

References

Araneomorphae genera
Lamponidae
Spiders of Australia
Spiders of New Zealand